Dog It Down is a 2012 short film directed by Mark Haapala and produced by Kevin Connolly. It is based on the true story of three US Navy sailors who were trapped under water for 17 days in an air-tight compartment aboard the  during the Japanese attack on Pearl Harbor.

Reception
The film won Best Short Film of 2012 at the  Hollywood Reel Independent Film Festival. It also screened and received recognition at: the GI Film Festival, The Newport Beach Film Festival, and would later air on both PBS and the Military channel.

References

External links
 

2012 films
2012 drama films
2012 short films
American drama short films
Films scored by Michael Tavera
2010s American films